Aranganur  is a village in the Bahour Commune of Bahour taluk  in the Union Territory of Puducherry, India. It lies on the north side of the Bahour enclave of Puducherry district. Aranganur is a part of Seliamedu Village Panchayat.

Geography
Seliamedu is bordered by  Bahour in the west, Keezh Kumaramangalam village of Tamil nadu in the north, Nagappanur village of Tamil nadu in east and Kudiyiruppupalayam in the south.

Road Network
Aranganur lies on the Villianur - Bahour road (RC-18).

Gallery

Politics
Aranganur is a part of the Embalam (Union Territory Assembly constituency) which comes under the Puducherry (Lok Sabha constituency)

References

External links
Official website of the Government of the Union Territory of Puducherry

Villages in Puducherry district